Bizarre parosteal osteochondromatous proliferation (BPOP), also known as Nora's lesion, is a type of non-cancerous bone tumor belonging to the group of cartilage tumors. It is generally seen in the tubular bones of the hands and feet, where it presents with a rapidly enlarging painless lump in a finger or toe.

It is composed of bone, cartilage and spindle cells. Some people report previous trauma.

Diagnosis is by medical imaging. Treatment is by surgical excision. Up to 50% recur after surgery.

It is rare, and occurs more often in the 20s and 30s. Combined with subungal exostosis, it accounts for less than 5% of cartilage tumors. Males and females are affected equally. The condition was first described by Frederick E. Nora in 1983.

Signs and symptoms
BPOP generally presents with a 1–3 cm painless lump in a finger or more frequently a toe. Growth can be rapid.

Mechanism
It is composed of bone, cartilage and spindle cells. A small number of people have reported previous trauma.

Diagnosis
Medical imaging usually shows a well-defined wide-based bony growth on the surface of bone.

Differential diagnosis
BPOP is distinct from subungal exostosis. Conditions that may appear similar to BPOP include: myositis ossficans, ostechondroma, surface osteosarcoma and granulomatous infection.

Treatment
Treatment is by surgical excision.

Outcomes
Up to 50% recur after surgery.

Epidemiology
BPOP is rare. It is most often seen in people in their 20s and 30s. Combined with subungal exostosis, it accounts for less than 5% of cartilage tumors. Males and females are affected equally.

History
Bizarre parosteal osteochondromatous proliferation was first described by Frederick E. Nora in 1983. Generally in the US, it has been thought of as a mouthful and hence it is sometimes referred to as Nora's lesion.

Other animals
In 1998 a report of a similar lesion to BPOP was reported in a wallaby.

References

Osseous and chondromatous neoplasia